Mr. Duplicate is a 2011 Kannada film in the romance genre starring Diganth and Prajwal Devaraj in the lead roles. Sheetal Injudhan Khan, a newcomer is the main female lead. The film is directed by veteran Kodlu Ramakrishna. Mano Murthy is the music director of the film. Kashyap Dakoju has produced the film under the banner Real Wealth venture productions. The film is a remake of 2001 Tamil hit Minnale starring R. Madhavan, Abbas and Reema Sen.

Cast 

 Diganth as Vicky 
 Sheetal Injudhan Khan as Poornima 
 Prajwal Devaraj as Nandu 
 Devaraj
 Ramesh Bhat
 Sudha Belawadi
 Anand
 Sushma

Music

Reception

Critical response 

A critic from Bangalore Mirror wrote  "The film is not bad per se, but it brutally exposes the makers’ lack of creativity despite having a dazzling star cast.It's getting clear that most directors can't take Sandalwood forward". A critic from News18 India wrote "All the veteran actors like Ramesh Bhat, Thulasi and Sudha Belawadi have aptly fitted into their respective roles.  'Mr. Duplicate' is no match for 'Minnale' but it is good for a one-time watch". Sunayana Suresh from DNA wrote "Newcomer Sheetal shows promise and has a certain yesteryear heroine charm to her face. Mano Murthy’s music is melodious and reminds you of the retro Kannada songs of the 70s and 80s and the dialogues and cinematography are quite impressive". A critic from The Times of India scored the film at 3.5 out of 5 stars and wrote "Prajwal is impressive with his mature acting, Diganth is simply superb, Sheetal plays her role very well, Ramesh Bhat and Devaraj are gracious. The music composer Mano Murthy has come up with some catchy tunes".

References 

2011 films
2010s Kannada-language films
Kannada remakes of Tamil films
Films scored by Mano Murthy
Films directed by Kodlu Ramakrishna